At least four ships of the French Navy have borne the name Le Glorieux:

 , flagship of Jean d'Estrées, sunk at the Battle of Tabago in 1677.
 , a late-17th-century ship commanded by Jean Bart.
 , a 528-ton, 16-gun ship built in Saint-Malo in 1749.
 , a  commissioned in 1934 and decommissioned in 1952

See also
 , a second-rate 74-gun ship-of-the-line in the French Navy launched in 1756, later commissioned in the Royal Navy as HMS Glorieux

French Navy ship names